South Centre or South Center may refer to:

South Center, Indiana, unincorporated town in Union Township, LaPorte County, Indiana, United States
South Centre Township, Pennsylvania, township in Columbia County, Pennsylvania, United States
South Centre (organization), intergovernmental organization of developing countries 
Southcentre Mall, Calgary, Alberta, Canada